Slavonian derby is the name given to matches between the two most successful Croatian football clubs from the eastern Croatian region of Slavonia, the Osijek-based NK Osijek and Vinkovci-based HNK Cibalia. , since Croatian independence the derby was played 63 times, of which 53 in 1. HNL and 10 in the Croatian Cup. In former Yugoslavia, the two clubs played 30 derbies, including 10 in the Yugoslav First League (1982 to 1987) and 20 in the Yugoslav Second League. The teams are supported by their fanbases called Kohorta and Ultrasi, at times infamously engaging in hooliganism at the time of the derby.

Results

Last updated on 9 May 2018.

List of matches

Key

1982–1987 (Yugoslav First League)

1992–present (Prva HNL and Croatian Cup)

Note: Home team's score always shown first

Top scorers
This is the list of top scoring players in the derby since 1982. Data updated up to the last derby played on 9 May 2018.

6 goals
 Josip Barišić (Osijek 5, Cibalia 1)

5 goals
 Mladen Bartolović (Cibalia)

4 goals
 Nenad Bjelica (Osijek)
 Davor Čop (Cibalia)
 Zoran Zekić (Cibalia)

3 goals
 Josip Balatinac (Osijek)
 Danijel Bogdan (Cibalia)
 Ivan Bošnjak (Cibalia)
 Branko Karačić (Osijek)
 Goran Ljubojević (Osijek)
 Anton Maglica (Osijek)
 Vedran Nikšić (Osijek)
 Antonio Perošević (Osijek)
 Ivo Smoje (Osijek)
 Robert Špehar (Osijek)
 Dubravko Zdrilić (Osijek)

Players who have scored for both clubs in the derby

 Josip Barišić (6 goals, 5 for Osijek and 1 for Cibalia)
 Hrvoje Plavšić (2 goals, 1 for Osijek and 1 for Cibalia)
 Ivica Šimunec (2 goals, 1 for Osijek and 1 for Cibalia)

Players who have played for both clubs (senior career)

Dušan Alempić
Marijan Antolović
Davor Bajsić
Ivan Baraban
Josip Barišić
Mario Barišić
Danijel Bogdan
Krešimir Brkić
Davor Burcsa
Tomislav Čuljak
Ivica Duspara
Radoslav Gusić
Sejad Halilović
Igor Hodonj
Kristijan Knežević

Ivica Kulešević
Josip Lukačević
Andrej Lukić
Marko Malenica
Goran Meštrović
Josip Milardović
Ivan Miličević
Matija Mišić
Ilica Perić
Marko Pervan
Hrvoje Plavšić
Dejan Prijić
Igor Prijić
Tomislav Radotić
Darko Raić-Sudar

Tihomir Rudež
Tomislav Steinbrückner
Ivica Šimunec
Tomislav Štrkalj
Mario Tadić
Igor Tkalčević
Josip Tomašević
Tomislav Višević
Frane Vitaić
Marijan Vuka
Željko Vuković
Zoran Zekić
Matias Zubak

Managers who have worked at both clubs
Branko Karačić
Ivica Matković
Stanko Mršić
Ivo Šušak
Tonko Vukušić

Head-to-head league ranking
The following table shows the final position of the two clubs in Prva HNL, the Croatian top football league. Druga HNL is shown for the seasons in which one of the clubs competed in that league due to relegation. In summary, Osijek finished the league competition ahead of Cibalia a total of 16 times, while Cibalia finished ahead of Osijek on 6 occasions.

Source: HRnogomet.com

References

NK Osijek
Football derbies in Croatia
HNK Cibalia
Slavonia